Kolpakov, or Kolpakova (feminine; Колпакова) is a Russian surname that may refer to:

Georgi Kolpakov (born 1979), a Russian professional footballer
Irina Kolpakova (born 1933), Russian ballerina
Ivan Kolpakov (born 1983), Russian journalist
Sasha Kolpakov (born 1943), Romani musician and composer from Russia
Serafim Kolpakov (1933–2011), Soviet engineer and politician
Tatyana Kolpakova (born 1959), Soviet long jumper
Vitaliy Kolpakov (born 1972), Ukrainian athlete

Russian-language surnames